Encephalartos concinnus is a species of cycad in the family Zamiaceae. It is endemic to Zimbabwe. It is known as the Runde cycad.

Description
It is an arborescent plant, with erect or decumbent stem, without branches, up to 2.5–3 m tall and with a diameter of 35–45 cm, covered with tomentose cataphylls. 

The pinnate leaves, arranged in a crown at the apex of the stem, are 150–200 cm long, composed of about 50 pairs of lanceolate leaflets, with margins endowed with small spines and arranged on the rachis at an angle of 45-80°.

It is a dioecious species, endowed with 1-4 fusiform male cones, sessile, green in color, 30–50 cm long and with a diameter of 7–10 cm, with broad and rhombic-shaped microsporophylls, and 1-2 female cones, ovoid, always green, but 35–45 cm long and with a diameter of 15–20 cm, with macrosporophylls with a warty surface.

The seeds have an oblong shape, are 30–35 mm long, have a width of 8–23 mm and are covered with a brown sarcotesta.

Range

This species grows in steep, rocky, misty valleys and woodlands. There are three known subpopulations, though one may have been extirpated. The plant is threatened by overcollection.

There are 3 subpopulations found in:
Gwanda, Matabeleland South
Mberengwa, Midlands
Runde, Masvingo

References

External links
Encephalartos concinnus. Tropicos.
 
 

concinnus
Plants described in 1969
Endemic flora of Zimbabwe